The Christmas Attic is the second album by the American rock band Trans-Siberian Orchestra, released in 1998. The cover art is by Edgar Jerins.

On September 5, 2019, The Christmas Attic was certified 2× platinum by the Recording Industry Association of America.

References to other carols and works
"Boughs of Holly" is a reworking of "Deck the Halls".
"March of the Kings/Hark! The Herald Angels Sing," besides the obvious carol, is also a rock version of the Farandole from Bizet's L'Arlésienne's Suite No. 2.
"The Three Kings and I (What Really Happened)" briefly quotes "O Holy Night" and the "Hallelujah" chorus.
"Christmas Canon" is based on Pachelbel's Canon.
The "Joy" section of "Joy/Angels We Have Heard on High" is a reworking of Bach's "Jesu, Joy of Man's Desiring."

Track listing

The album was re-released in 2001 with a companion track to "The World That She Sees" (which was shortened from 6 minutes to just 3) called "The World That He Sees" inserted into the track listing directly after "She Sees" and having a length of 4:45. The last track "Music Box Blues" was also truncated to 4:57; this version was previously used in the TSO film The Ghosts of Christmas Eve.

Personnel

Performers

Vocals 
Solos
 Jody Ashworth
 Joe Cerisano
 Katrina Chester
 Marlene Danielle
 Thomas Farese
 Peggy Harley
 Daryl B. Pediford

Back–Ups
 Latisha Jordan – background coordinator
 Peggy Harley
 Robert Kinkel
 Maurice Lauchner
 Al Pitrelli
 Jon Oliva
 Timara Sanders
 Zak Stevens
 Doug Thoms
 Yolanda Wyns

Child choir 
 Dan Moriarty – conductor

Choir
 The Choristers, St. Bartholomew's Church, New York City
 Marilina Acosta
 Brendan Burgess
 Julia George
 Shoshana Frishberg
Julian Drabik
 Jack Gibson
 Nina Gottlieb
 Erick Hernandez
 Michelle Repella
 Anton Spivack

Orchestra 
 Robert Kinkel – piano and keyboards
 Jon Oliva – piano, keyboards and bass guitar
 Al Pitrelli – lead, rhythm and bass guitars
 Paul O'Neill, Chris Caffery – rhythm guitars
 Johnny Lee Middleton – bass guitar
 Jeff Plate – drums

Production
 Paul O'Neill – producer
 Robert Kinkel – co–producer, additional engineering
 Dave Wittman – recording and mixing engineer
 Darren Rapp, Kathy Rich, Robert Duryea, Steve Ship, Tim Ronaghan – assistant engineers
 Joe Johnson, Michael Shielzi, Sheldon Guide – additional engineering
 Gin–Won Lee – additional engineering assistant
 Kevin Hodge – mastering at The Cutting Room, New York

Charts

Weekly charts

Year-end charts

References

External links
 Trans-Siberian Orchestra Homepage

Trans-Siberian Orchestra albums
Concept albums
1998 Christmas albums
Christmas albums by American artists
Rock operas
Rock Christmas albums
Lava Records albums
Albums produced by Paul O'Neill (rock producer)